Rogério Dutra da Silva and Júlio Silva were the defending champions, but they decided not to participate together.
Dutra da Silva played alongside Tiago Fernandes. They lost in the semifinals against Juan Sebastián Cabal and Robert Farah.
Silva partners up with Ricardo Hocevar.

Colombian pair Cabal and Farah won the title. They defeated Ricardo Hocevar and Júlio Silva 6–2, 6–3 in the final.

Seeds

Draw

Draw

References
 Main Draw

MasterCard Tennis Cup - Doubles
MasterCard Tennis Cup
Mast